The 1964 Taça de Portugal Final was the final match of the 1963–64 Taça de Portugal, the 24th season of the Taça de Portugal, the premier Portuguese football cup competition organized by the Portuguese Football Federation (FPF). The match was played on 5 July 1964 at the Estádio Nacional in Oeiras, and opposed two Primeira Liga sides: Benfica and Porto. Benfica defeated Porto 6–2 to claim their twelfth Taça de Portugal.

Match

Details

References 

1964
Taca
S.L. Benfica matches
FC Porto matches
Taça de Portugal Final